Harvey C. Chrouser (August 7, 1912 – April 21, 2002) was an American football coach and college athletics administrator. He served as the head football coach at Sterling College in Sterling, Kansas from 1935 to 1939 and two stints as the head football coach at Wheaton College in Wheaton, Illinois, from 1940 to 1941 and 1946 to 1960, compiling a career college football coaching record of 121–55–14.

Coaching career

Sterling
Chrouser was the head football coach at Sterling College in Sterling, Kansas for five seasons, from 1935 to 1939, compiling a record of 17–21–6.

Wheaton
After his work at Sterling, he moved to Wheaton College in Wheaton, Illinois, where he served as athletic director.  After a few years of starting at Wheaton, he took a break to serve in the United States Navy as a lieutenant commander under George Halas.  Halas wanted him to come to the Chicago Bears as a coach, but Chrouser wanted to return to his work with youth.

Chrouser was the 11th and then later the 14th head coach for the Thunder.  He held that position for 17 seasons, from  1940 through 1941 and then again from 1946 until 1960.  His coaching record at Wheaton was 104–34–8.

Head coaching record

College

References

External links
 

1912 births
2002 deaths
Sterling Warriors football coaches
Wheaton Thunder athletic directors
Wheaton Thunder football coaches
United States Navy personnel of World War II
United States Navy officers
People from Stratford, Wisconsin
Military personnel from Wisconsin